August Henry Rodenberg (July 25, 1873 – April 12, 1933) was an American tug of war athlete who competed in the 1904 Summer Olympics. He was born and died in St. Louis, Missouri. In the 1904 Olympics he won a silver medal as a member of Southwest Turnverein of Saint Louis No. 1 team.

References

External links
profile

1873 births
1933 deaths
Sportspeople from St. Louis
Olympic tug of war competitors of the United States
Tug of war competitors at the 1904 Summer Olympics
Olympic silver medalists for the United States in tug of war
Medalists at the 1904 Summer Olympics